Dhaban is a village in Sangaria Tehsil in Hanumangarh District of Rajasthan State, India. It belongs to Bikaner Division . It is located 39 km towards North from District headquarters Hanumangarh. 12 km from Sangaria. 413 km from State capital Jaipur. Co-ordinates of village main bus stand 29°52'34.8"N 74°30'33.3"E.

References 

Villages in Hanumangarh district